Maurice Maunoury was a French politician born 16 October 1863 in Alexandria (Egypt) and died 16 May 1925 in Paris

Député for Eure-et-Loir from 1910 to 1924
Minister of the Colonies from 9 to 13 June 1914 in the Alexandre Ribot government
Minister of the Interior from 15 January 1922 to 29 March 1924 in the Raymond Poincaré government

External links

 

1863 births
1925 deaths
Politicians from Alexandria
Democratic Republican Alliance politicians
French Ministers of the Colonies
French interior ministers